The 1966 Daytona 500, the 8th running of the event, was won by Richard Petty driving a 1966 Plymouth on February 27, 1966.  Petty drove his number 43 to victory in just over three hours after starting the race on the pole.  There were four caution flags which slowed the race for 22 laps.  Petty came from two laps down to win the event after 198 laps were completed.  The race was shortened by two laps due to rain.  The win was Petty's second victory of the season.

1966 season 

The 1966 season marked the return of the Chrysler Hemi engine in NASCAR competition, while Ford took a one-year leave from competition before realizing that the ploy was detrimental to their sales.  The 1966 Daytona 500 was the fifth event of 49 in the 1966 season, which included the two qualifying races for the 500.  The 1966 season opened in Augusta with Petty taking the win in the season inaugural event.  Dan Gurney followed with a win in Riverside before the drivers and their teams ventured to Daytona International Speedway for the  event.  NASCAR ran a total of 49 events, ending at the Rockingham Speedway in October.  David Pearson won the NASCAR Grand National Series Championship after winning 15 events while 168 drivers competed in at least one event during the 1966 season.

Background

Qualifying 
The two 100 mile qualifying events were won by Paul Goldsmith driving a number 99 1965 Plymouth, who bested second-place finisher Richard Petty, and Earl Balmer driving his number 3 1965 Dodge. A total of 50 drivers started the Daytona 500 in 1966, and a total of 18 cars were still running at the conclusion of the race.

Qualifying race results

First qualifier
 #99 – Paul Goldsmith
 #43 – Richard Petty
 #7 – Don White
 #21 – Marvin Panch
 #28 – Fred Lorenzen
 #98 – Sam McQuagg
 #71 – Gordon Johncock
 #16 – Darel Dieringer
 #9 – Larry Frank
 #27 – Cale Yarborough

Second qualifier
 #3 – Earl Balmer
 #56 – Jim Hurtubise
 #29 – Dick Hutcherson
 #12 – LeeRoy Yarbrough
 #11 – Ned Jarrett
 #6  – David Pearson
 #26 – Bobby Isaac
 #14 – Jim Paschal
 #49 – G.C. Spencer
 #79 – Frank Warren

The Race 

After starting on the 1966 Daytona 500 pole, Petty went on to lead the first six laps of the event, before relinquishing the lead to Paul Goldsmith, who had started in the third position.  Petty and Goldsmith swapped the lead back and forth a total of four times before Dick Hutcherson drove his number 29 1966 Ford into the lead on lap 34.  Petty suffered from tire problems early in the race, yet work by his pit crew, and having one of the fastest cars allowed him to work his way back to the front of the field.  In 2008 Petty said: "...we was the quickest car all week long. That car, again, like the '64 car, was just a real fast car, and we just outrun everybody."  Petty returned to the lead on lap 97 when he overtook Goldsmith.  A total of 6 drivers exchanged the lead 15 times throughout the event, with Petty, Goldsmith, Hutcherson, Cale Yarborough, Marvin Panch, Jim Hurtubise all leading at least one lap.  On lap 113 Petty took the lead for the final time, and went on to finish more than a full lap ahead of second-place finisher Yarborough.  Petty went on to lead a race-high 108 laps by the time the checkered flag fell.

The victory by Petty was his second at the Daytona International Speedway, having won the event in 1964.  Richard Petty's victory at the 1966 Daytona 500 was the first and only time that he captured the pole position, despite winning the event a record seven times?  As of 2009, Richard Petty is the only driver to win the event seven times: 1964, 1966, 1971, 1973, 1974, 1979, and 1981.  The driver with the second highest number of victories would be Cale Yarborough, with a total of 4 victories; 1968, 1977, 1983 and 1984.  The 1966 Daytona 500 was the first time that a driver won the event for a second time.

Results

References 

Citations

Bibliography

 

Daytona 500
Daytona 500
Daytona 500
NASCAR races at Daytona International Speedway